A soundbar, sound bar or media bar is a type of loudspeaker that projects audio from a wide enclosure. It is much wider than it is tall, partly for acoustic reasons, and partly so it can be mounted above or below a display device (e.g. above a computer monitor or under a home theater or television screen). In a soundbar, multiple speakers are placed in a single cabinet, which helps to create stereo sound or a surround-sound effect. A separate subwoofer is typically included with, or may be used to supplement, a soundbar.

History 
Early passive versions simply integrated left, centre and right speakers into one enclosure, sometimes called an "LCR soundbar".

Altec Lansing introduced a multichannel soundbar in 1998 called the Voice Of The Digital Theatre or the ADA106. It was a powered speaker system that offered stereo, Dolby Pro-Logic and AC3 surround sound from the soundbar and a separate subwoofer. The soundbar housed four 3″ full range drivers and two 1″ tweeters while the subwoofer housed one 8″ dual voice coil driver. It used Altec Lansing’s side-firing technology and algorithms to provide surround sound from the sides, rear and front. This configuration eliminated the wiring of separate speakers and the space they would require.

Advantages and disadvantages 
Soundbars are relatively small and can be easily positioned under a display, are easy to set up, and are usually less expensive than other stereo sound systems. However, because of their smaller size and lack of flexibility in positioning, soundbars do not fill a room with sound as well as separate-speaker stereo systems do.

Soundbar hybrid 
To take advantages both from soundbar and stereo set system, some manufacturers produce soundbar hybrids in which the soundbar represents left, center, and right speakers plus (wireless) subwoofer and rear-left and rear-right speakers. Sometimes producers make soundbars with left, center, and right speakers plus detachable charge rear-left and rear-right speakers.

With the increasing availability of Dolby Atmos content since 2021, it has become increasingly important for soundbars to produce height effects. To deliver a realistic sense of height from a soundbar hybrid system, audio specialized companies such as Nakamichi have developed proprietary upmixing algorithms, using a combination of spatial-amplification, phase improvements, and height effect sound layer interlacing to deliver realistic vertical effects. Another method that soundbars may employ to deliver height effects is through the use of up-firing speakers, which rely heavily on the ceiling of the room to bounce height effects off the ceiling, towards the listener.

Usage 
Soundbars were primarily designed to generate strong sound with good bass response. Soundbar usage has increased steadily as the world has moved to flat-screen displays. Earlier television sets and display units were primarily CRT-based; hence the box was bigger, facilitating larger speakers with good response. But with flat-screen televisions the depth of the screen is reduced dramatically, leaving little room for speakers. As a result, the built-in speakers lack bass response. Soundbars help to bridge this gap.

See also 
 Soundbase

References

American inventions
Loudspeakers